The 300 metre military rifle, standing was a shooting sports event held as part of the Shooting at the 1920 Summer Olympics programme. It was the fourth appearance for military rifle events  and the second time that medals were awarded for the prone position. The first time was the competition in 1900. The competition was held on 29 and 30 July 1920. 16 shooters from 7 nations competed.

Results

The maximum score was 60.

References

External links
 Official Report
 

Shooting at the 1920 Summer Olympics